Thazhava  is a village in Karunagappally taluk, Kollam district in the state of Kerala, India.

Demographic-Census Data 2011

Here many seek a livelihood based on Thazha or screw pine. Screw pine weaving of mats is one of the oldest crafts popular in Thazhava. Even though now the weaving of screw pine mats have been comparatively reduced than the earlier times, there exists few traditional weavers who still continue this profession. Mats are now being exported within as well as outside India.

In the ancient times, screw pine mats were weaved and distributed in bulk to various provinces within Kerala including Travancore province.

See also
 Pulimukham Devi Temple
Thazhava Sree krishna swamy Temple

Transport

Main transport is provided by State owned Kerala State Road Transport Corporation (KSRTC) and private transport bus operators.

Karunagappally railway station is the nearest railway station.

Trivandrum International Airport is the nearest airport.

References

Villages in Kollam district